Bashky-Terek is a village in Jalal-Abad Region of Kyrgyzstan. Its population was 1,000 in 2021.

References
 

Populated places in Jalal-Abad Region